Tiberiu Negrean (born 1 September 1988 in Cluj-Napoca) is a Romanian water polo player. At the 2012 Summer Olympics, he competed for the Romania men's national water polo team in the men's event. He is 6 ft 2 inches tall.

References

External links
 

1988 births
Living people
Romanian male water polo players
Olympic water polo players of Romania
Water polo players at the 2012 Summer Olympics
Sportspeople from Cluj-Napoca